Teten is both a given name and a surname. Notable people with the name include:

Given name
Teten Masduki (born 1963), Indonesian social activist

Surname
Howard Teten (1932–2021), American former instructor at the FBI Academy

See also
 Tetens